Vasil Spasov may refer to:

 Vasil Spasov (chess player) (born 1971), Bulgarian chess grandmaster
 Vasil Spasov (footballer) (1919–1996), Bulgarian football player and manager